Krzysztof Zalewski (born 24 August 1984) is a Polish singer and the winner of Idol (Poland) season two.

Discography

Studio albums

Music videos

References

1984 births
Living people
Polish keyboardists
Polish guitarists
Polish male guitarists
Polish drummers
Male drummers
Idols (TV series) winners
Polish pop singers
Polish rock singers
21st-century Polish male singers
21st-century Polish singers
21st-century guitarists
21st-century drummers
Musicians from Lublin